Bion may refer to:

Science 
 Bion (satellite), a series of Soviet satellites from the 1960s and 1970s
 Bion, in physics, the bound state of two solitons
 Bions, hypothetical corpuscles of biological energy proposed by psychoanalyst Wilhelm Reich

Places
 Bion, Manche, a commune in France
 Saint-Agnin-sur-Bion, a commune of southeastern France
 Revest-du-Bion, a French commune near the Alps

People with the given name Bion
 Bion of Miletus, a Greek sculptor (6th -5th century BC)
 Bion of Smyrna,  also known as Bion of Phlossa, bucolic Greek poet (fl. 2nd century BC)
 Bion of Abdera, a Greek philosopher from the school of Democritus (fl. c. 4th century BC)
 Bion of Soli, an ancient Greek writer of history

 Bion of Borysthenes, a popular Greek philosopher (325–250 BC)
 Bion Barnett, the founder of Barnett Bank, in Florida
 Bion Tsang, American cellist and professor
 Bion J. Arnold, 1861–1942, American electrical engineer

People with the surname Bion
 Louis-Eugène Bion (1807-1860), French sculptor
 Nicholas Bion (1652–1733), French scientific instrument-maker 
 Wilfred Bion, a British psychoanalyst
 Anne-Sophie Bion, French film editor

Other uses
 Bion (opera), an opera by the French composer Étienne Méhul
 BionX,  Canadian maker of electric motors for bicycles
 Bion, a fictional planet in Metroid Prime: Federation Force

See also
Bionic